Min Woo-hyuk (born September 18, 1983) is a South Korean actor, model and singer. He is best known for his main role in The Third Charm. He is also known for his supporting role in Love with Flaws as Joo Won-jae. He debuted as a musical actor in the musical The March of Youth in 2013, as an actor in OCN's drama Holyland on April 28, 2012 and as a singer on April 23, 2005 with the album titled “SUN HA 1st Album”.

Personal life
Min Woo-hyuk is a musical actor married to Lee Semi. They have a son (2015) and a daughter (2020) .

Filmography

Television series

Variety show

Theater

Ambassadorship
 11th Daegu International Musical Festival DIMF Ambassador

References

External links 
 
 

1983 births
Living people
21st-century South Korean male actors
South Korean male models
South Korean male television actors
South Korean male film actors
South Korean male singers
South Korean pop singers